Liam Cunningham (born 2 June 1961) is an Irish actor. He is known for playing Davos Seaworth in the HBO epic-fantasy series Game of Thrones.

Cunningham has been nominated for the London Film Critics' Circle Award, the British Independent Film Award, has won two Irish Film & Television Awards, and shared a BAFTA with Michael Fassbender, for their crime-drama short film Pitch Black Heist. His film roles include A Little Princess (1995), Jude (1996), Dog Soldiers (2002), The Crooked Man (2003), The Wind That Shakes the Barley (2006), Hunger (2008), The Escapist (2008), Good Vibrations (2013), Let Us Prey (2014) and The Childhood of a Leader (2015). In 2020, he was listed at number 36 on The Irish Times list of Ireland's greatest film actors.

Early life
Cunningham was born in East Wall, which is an inner city area of the Northside of Dublin. He grew up in Kilmore West with his three sisters and a brother. Cunningham left secondary school at 15 and pursued a career as an electrician. In the 1980s, Cunningham moved to Zimbabwe for three years where he maintained electrical equipment at a safari park and trained Zimbabwean electricians. After returning to Ireland, Cunningham became dissatisfied with his work as an electrician and decided to pursue his interest in acting. He attended acting classes and began to work in local theatre, including the Royal Shakespeare Company. He appeared in a production of Studs at The Tricycle Theatre in Kilburn, London.

Career

Cunningham's debut film role came in Into the West (1992), where he played a police officer. His on-screen acting continued with roles in War of the Buttons (1994), and A Little Princess (1995), before making his role as Phillotson in Jude (1996). He continued with character roles in Falling for a Dancer (TV, 1998), RKO 281 (1999), Shooting the Past (TV, 1999), When the Sky Falls (2000) and Stranded (2002). Cunningham came to international prominence with his role as Captain Ryan in the critically acclaimed, independent horror film, Dog Soldiers (2002).

Cunningham starred in well-received films such as The Wind That Shakes the Barley (2006) which won the Palme d'Or at the Cannes Film Festival; Hunger; The Escapist (both 2008); The Guard; and Black Butterflies (both 2011). He also had roles in many high budget British and American films including The League of Gentlemen's Apocalypse (2005), The Mummy: Tomb of the Dragon Emperor (2008), Harry Brown (2009), Clash of the Titans, Centurion (both 2010). On television, he appeared as President Richard Tate in the BBC programme Outcasts. Cunningham was producer Philip Segal’s first choice to portray the Eighth Doctor in the TV movie of Doctor Who (1996), but was vetoed by Fox executives.

In 2012, Cunningham joined the main cast for the second season of HBO's Game of Thrones portraying former smuggler Davos Seaworth, and in 2013 he starred in The Numbers Station alongside John Cusack. He was also cast in season 5 of the BBC series Merlin as a sorcerer. He featured in the music video for "High Hopes" by Irish alternative rock band Kodaline from their EP The High Hopes. In April 2013, he appeared in the seventh series of the BBC One series Doctor Who in the episode "Cold War", where he played Captain Zhukov, the commander of a Russian submarine in 1983 facing one of the Ice Warriors. He guest starred in the second season of the VH1 television series Stay Closer, with Sandra Bullock and Jessica Chastain. In 2015, he played the father in Brady Corbet's directorial debut film, The Childhood of a Leader.

In February 2020, it was announced that Cunningham would voice Man-At-Arms in the Netflix animated series Masters of the Universe: Revelation.

Personal life
Cunningham resides in Dublin with his wife Colette, with whom he has three children, daughter Ellen and sons Liam Jr. and Sean.

Politics
In 2015, Cunningham was one of over 100 artists who signed a letter to The Guardian announcing support for a cultural boycott of Israel.

Cunningham endorsed Solidarity–People Before Profit in the 2020 Irish general election.

Filmography

Film

Television

Music videos

Awards and nominations

References

External links
 

1961 births
20th-century Irish male actors
21st-century Irish male actors
Irish male film actors
Irish male stage actors
Irish male television actors
Living people
Male actors from Dublin (city)
People from Coolock